Jamno may refer to:

Jamno (lake), close to the Baltic Sea in West Pomeranian Voivodeship (north-west Poland) 
Jamno, Gryfino County in West Pomeranian Voivodeship (north-west Poland)
Jamno, Koszalin County in West Pomeranian Voivodeship (north-west Poland)
Jamno, Łowicz County in Łódź Voivodeship (central Poland)
Jamno, Zduńska Wola County in Łódź Voivodeship (central Poland)
Jamno, Świętokrzyskie Voivodeship (south-central Poland)
Jamno, Masovian Voivodeship (east-central Poland)
Jamno, Silesian Voivodeship (south Poland)
Jamno, Sulęcin County in Lubusz Voivodeship (west Poland)
Jamno, Pomeranian Voivodeship (north Poland)
Jamno, Żary County in Lubusz Voivodeship (west Poland)
 Jamno, Croatia, a village near Bednja